Podestà is the name given to certain high officials in many Italian cities beginning in the later Middle Ages.

Podesta or Podestà may also refer to:

People
Podesta (surname)
Podestà of Constantinople, the official in charge of Venetian possessions in the Latin Empire and the Venetian quarter of Constantinople during the 13th century
Podestà-troubadours, Italian troubadours who were also podestas

Places
Podesta (island), a phantom island reported in 1879
Pablo Podestá, Buenos Aires, a town in Tres de Febrero Partido of Buenos Aires Province, Argentina
Palazzo del Podesta (disambiguation), a number of palaces in Italy

Business and Economy
Podesta Baldocchi, a florist in San Francisco, founded in 1871
Podesta Group, a lobbying and public affairs firm based in Washington, D.C.
Heather Podesta + Partners, American government relations firm

See also
Podesta emails, the compromised email account of John Podesta, Hillary Clinton's 2016 U.S. presidential campaign chairman
Podestat Formation, a geologic formation in France
Cesar Torque Podesta Airport, an airport serving the city of Moquegua, Peru